The Pittsburgh Panthers football program is a college football team that represents the University of Pittsburgh in the Atlantic Coast Conference, a part of the Division I Football Bowl Subdivision.  The team has had 36 head coaches since its first recorded football game in 1893.

Key

Head coaches
Statistics correct as of January 1, 2023.

Notes

References

Lists of college football head coaches

Pennsylvania sports-related lists